"Kinsan Ginsan" (きんさんぎんさん), was the affectionate name of Japanese identical twin sisters from Nagoya, widely known for their longevity, and for being the oldest living twins. Their names literally translated from Japanese to English mean "Gold" and "Silver". Their health and vitality, despite being over 100 years old, was said to be "an ideal form of living in your sunset years", and they became national celebrities in Japan. They lived to ages 107 and 108.

History
The twins were born on August 1, 1892 in Narumi Village (currently in Midori Ward, Nagoya), Aichi Prefecture. Kin was the elder daughter and Gin was the younger daughter. Tests later proved that they were identical twins, though their blood types differed. 

In 1991, about to reach 100 years of age, the twins were featured in a newspaper article and received congratulations from both the mayor of Nagoya and the Aichi Prefecture governor. In 2000, Kin Narita, the elder twin died, aged 107 years and 175 days. The cause of death was heart failure, as confirmed by an autopsy. 13 months later, in February 2001, her younger sister Gin died at 108 years of age. The cause of death could not be attributed to any specific diagnosis and therefore was given as "old age". Their favourite food was fish with red flesh. 
One of the sisters has four daughters who also showed signs of longevity. The four sisters have taken part in a documentary by NHK, Today's Close-Up. The sisters also featured in a study about longevity. At the time of Kin's death in 2000 the twins combined had six children, 11 grandchildren, seven great-grandchildren and one great-great-grandchild.

References

 http://news.bbc.co.uk/1/hi/world/asia-pacific/1194040.stm
 http://articles.latimes.com/2001/mar/01/local/me-31938
 http://www.hellofuntime.com/2013/01/todays-close-up-20121120-forever-young.html

1892 births
19th-century Buddhists
2000 deaths
2001 deaths
Identical twins
Japanese Buddhists
Japanese centenarians
Musical groups from Aichi Prefecture
People from Nagoya
People of Meiji-period Japan
People of Shōwa-period Japan
People of Taishō-period Japan
Japanese twins
Women centenarians